The Gate of Thriving Imperial Clan (Manchu:  lung dzung men) is a gate in Beijing's Forbidden City, in China. It is located just southwest of the Gate of Heavenly Purity.

References

External links

Forbidden City
Gates of Beijing